= Cayman Observer =

Weekly newspaper in the Cayman Islands (defunct)

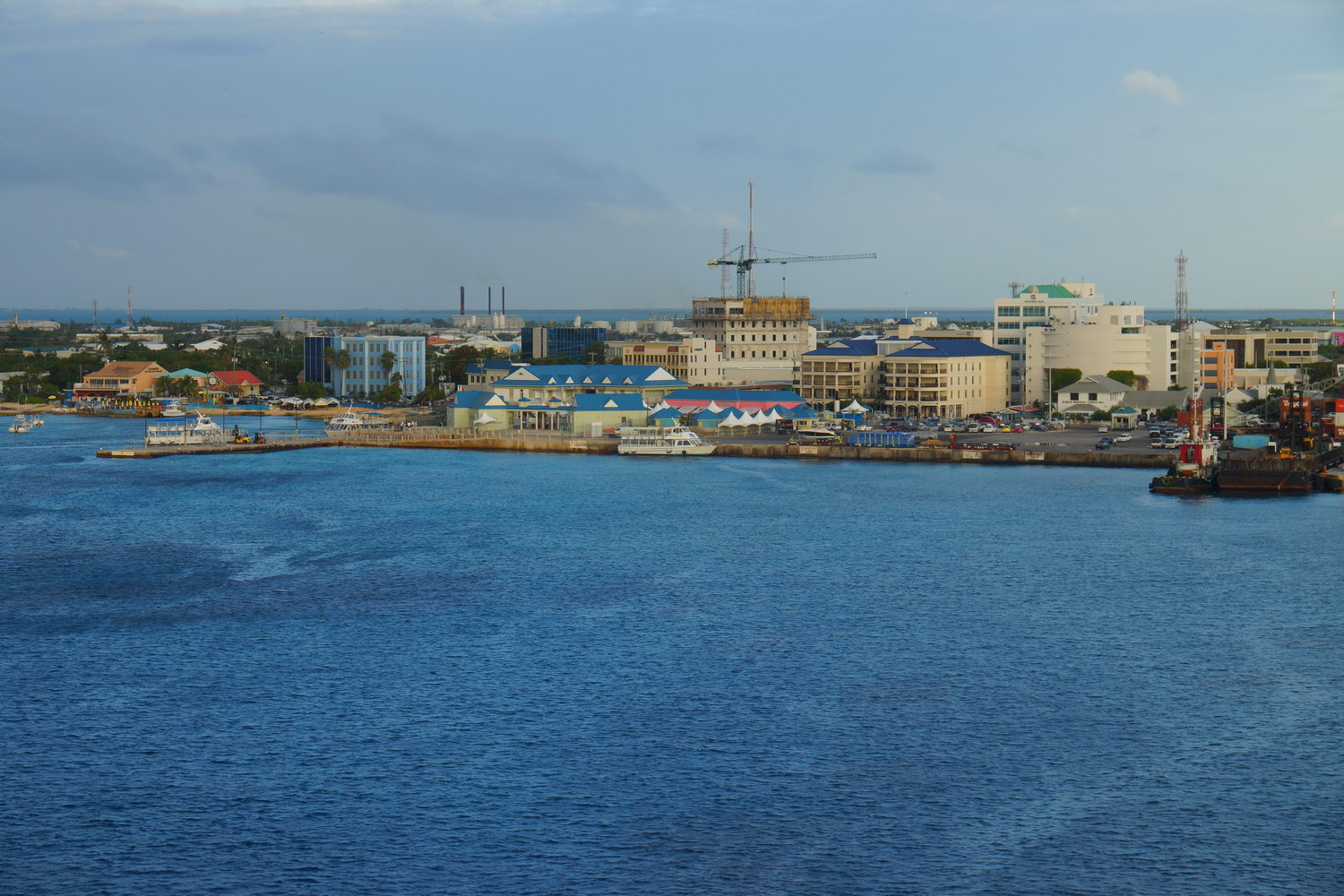
Pictured: George Town, Cayman Islands

The Cayman Observer was a weekly business-oriented newspaper based in the Cayman Islands. The newspaper was located in Alissta Towers, George Town, the capital of the Cayman Islands. In addition to offering business news, the newspaper showcased George Town's daily local news stories and featured national and international news. According to the Cayman Directory, the Cayman Observer is no longer operating.
